87-mm light field gun M1877 was a field gun utilized in Russo-Japanese War, World War I, Russian Civil War and a number of interwar period armed conflicts with participants from the former Russian Empire. The gun was initially developed by Krupp, but was also produced in the Russian Empire. Russian-manufactured pieces differed from the German-manufactured ones in breech type and construction elevation mechanism. The gun lacked recoil mechanism.

In addition to the standard variant, a lightweight version was produced. It had shorter barrel (18 calibers), which resulted in reduced muzzle velocity (412 m/s) and range (6 km), but also in much lighter construction (360 kg).

During World War I large number of guns were positioned in fortifications in western Finland. Early in the Finnish Civil War many of these guns were taken over by the Finnish White Guard and became its de facto standard artillery pieces. By the end of 1918 the Finnish Army possessed 144 guns of the type, but soon afterwards they were removed from active service because of obsolescence and their poor condition. A few remained in use in 1920s as practice pieces.

External links

87 K/77 at jaegerplatoon.net

 

Field guns
World War I guns
Artillery of the Russian Empire
87 mm artillery
World War I artillery of Russia
Russo-Japanese war weapons of Russia